Growth landmarks are parameters measured in infants, children and adolescents which help gauge where they are on a continuum of normal growth and development. 

Growth landmarks have also been used for determination of abnormal growth as well.

External links
Sexual development
https://web.archive.org/web/20120309203713/http://www.teachingsexualhealth.ca/parents/sexualdevelopment.html
Growth hormone and growth
http://www.ahrq.gov/clinic/epcsums/shortsum.htm
Growth in young brains
https://web.archive.org/web/20041129071550/http://www.loni.ucla.edu/~thompson/MEDIA/latimes.html
Growth and body composition
http://www.ajcn.org/cgi/content/full/80/5/1334

Child development